The 1955 New York Yankees season was the team's 53rd season. The team finished with a record of 96 wins and 58 losses, winning their 21st AL pennant, finishing 3 games ahead of the Cleveland Indians. New York was managed by Casey Stengel. The Yankees played their home games at Yankee Stadium. In the World Series, they were defeated by the Brooklyn Dodgers in 7 games.

Offseason
 November 17, 1954: Gene Woodling, Harry Byrd, Jim McDonald, Hal Smith, Gus Triandos, Willy Miranda and players to be named later were traded by the Yankees to the Baltimore Orioles for Don Larsen, Billy Hunter, Bob Turley, and players to be named later. The deal was completed on December 1, when the Yankees sent Bill Miller, Kal Segrist, Don Leppert, and Ted Del Guercio (minors) to the Orioles, and the Orioles sent Mike Blyzka, Darrell Johnson, Jim Fridley, and Dick Kryhoski to the Yankees.

Regular season

Season standings

Record vs. opponents

Notable transactions
 May 11, 1955: Enos Slaughter and Johnny Sain were traded by the Yankees to the Kansas City Athletics for Sonny Dixon and cash.
 July 30, 1955: Ed Lopat was traded by the Yankees to the Baltimore Orioles for Jim McDonald.
 September 14, 1955: Jerry Staley was selected off waivers by the New York Yankees from the Cincinnati Redlegs.

Roster

Player stats

Batting

Starters by position
Note: Pos = Position; G = Games played; AB = At bats; H = Hits; Avg. = Batting average; HR = Home runs; RBI = Runs batted in

Other batters
Note: G = Games played; AB = At bats; H = Hits; Avg. = Batting average; HR = Home runs; RBI = Runs batted in

Pitching

Starting pitchers
Note: G = Games pitched; IP = Innings pitched; W = Wins; L = Losses; ERA = Earned run average; SO = Strikeouts

Other pitchers
Note: G = Games pitched; IP = Innings pitched; W = Wins; L = Losses; ERA = Earned run average; SO = Strikeouts

Relief pitchers
Note: G = Games pitched; W = Wins; L = Losses; SV = Saves; ERA = Earned run average; SO = Strikeouts

1955 World Series

In Game One on September 28, Elston Howard became the sixth player in the history of the World Series to hit a home run in his first World Series at bat.

NL Brooklyn Dodgers (4) vs. AL New York Yankees (3)

Post-season exhibition
From October 11 to November 21, the Yankees embarked on a 25-game barnstorming exhibition tour. The team played five games in Hawaii, 16 games in Japan, one game in US-controlled Okinawa, two games in the Philippines, and one game in Guam; they won 24 of the 25 games and tied one game against an all-star team in Sendai.

Awards and honors
 Yogi Berra, American League MVP
All-Star Game

League leaders
 Whitey Ford, league leader, complete games (Ford was the first player to lead the American League in complete games with fewer than 20)

Farm system

LEAGUE CHAMPIONS: Monroe

Norfolk club folded, July 14, 1955

Notes

References
1955 New York Yankees at Baseball Reference
1955 World Series
1955 New York Yankees at Baseball Almanac

New York Yankees seasons
New York Yankees
New York Yankees
1950s in the Bronx
American League champion seasons